This was the first edition of the event.

Peter Fleming and Anders Järryd won in the final 7–6, 6–2, against Glenn Layendecker and Glenn Michibata.

Seeds

Draw

Draw

External links
Draw

Toronto Indoor
1985 Grand Prix (tennis)